Behbud Khan Javanshir (25 July 1878 – 18 July 1921) was an Azerbaijani politician, diplomat, Minister of Internal Affairs of Azerbaijan Democratic Republic and Deputy Minister of Trade and Industry.

Early life
Behbud Khan Javanshir was born on July 25, 1878 in Azad Qaraqoyunlu village of Javanshir Uyezd of Elisabethpol Governorate. His father Azad Khan Javanshir was the great grandson of the founder of Karabakh Khanate Panah Ali Khan. From 1890 through 1898, he studied at Tiflis Realny School where he learned German. In 1902, Javanshir enrolled in Freiberg University of Mining and Technology, graduating cum laude in 1906. He then moved to London where he learned English.

Upon his return to Azerbaijan in 1907, Javanshir started working as a senior engineer in the oil industry. According to archival documents, he was a member of the anti-government organization Difai along with Ahmad Bey Aghayev, Garay Bey Garaybeyov, Mammad Hasan Hajinski, Isa Bey Ashurbeyov and Niftali Bey Behbudov.

While travelling to Germany, Javanshir brought German wheat to Karabakh which was acclimatized by local farmers and is used today. He was also the first person to bring an automobile to Karabakh region at a time when roads were built. After March massacres of 1918, Javanshir was a member of Azerbaijani-Armenian reconciliation commission.

Political career
On June 17, 1918 Javanshir was appointed Minister of Internal Affairs of Azerbaijan Democratic Republic. On December 26, 1918 he was replaced by Khalil Bey Khasmammadov. Starting from October 6, 1918 as a deputy minister he was appointed acting Minister of Trade and Industry. Javanshir also served in the National Assembly of Azerbaijan.

After establishment of Soviet rule in Azerbaijan, with the assistance of Azerbaijani communist leader Nariman Narimanov, Javanshir was able to avoid imprisonment by the Bolsheviks and was assigned to work in Soviet oil fields in Baku. Due to his education in Germany, he was later assigned to represent the Soviet government first in Berlin, then from the summer of 1921 in Constantinople (now Istanbul), Ottoman Empire.

Assassination
Javanshir was assassinated on July 18, 1921 in Constantinople, in front of the Pera Palace Hotel.  The assassination was carried out by an Armenian, Misak Torlakian, in retaliation for Javanshir's role in the massacre of Armenians in Baku.  Torlakian was part of the Armenian Revolutionary Federation's "Operation Nemesis", and he was assisted by Ervand Fundukyan and (H)Arutiun (H)Arutuinyan. A Dashnak officer who had known Javanshir from Baku recognized him. Fundukyan and Arutuinyan were to follow him, and Torlokyan was to shoot him. Accompanied by his wife Tamara and brothers Jumshud and Surkhay, Javanshir was returning to the Pera Palace Hotel through the park after an evening at Tepebashi Theatre. Torlakian shot Javanshir with a Mauser pistol, once in the head and twice in the chest.  Javanshir was later pronounced dead in the hospital. Torlakian was apprehended.

Court and sentencing

When questioned by the police, Torlakian said the assassination was justified because of the killing of Armenians in Baku. He was "sued" by the British Military Tribunal. Torlakian's defense attorneys and an Armenian neurologist who examined him in prison claimed he had epileptic seizures due to "the emotional crises to which he is subject" making him "not responsible for his actions".  But a Turkish doctor claimed that he had neither epilepsy nor any mental disorders.

In October 1921, the British tribunal issued a guilty verdict but ruled that he was not responsible for his actions due to his epilepsy. Torlokyan left for Greece, where he was released and left for the United States.

See also
Azerbaijani National Council

Notes

Further reading
Yeghiayan, Vartkes and Ara Arabyan. The Case of Misak Torlakian. Center for Armenian Remembrance, 2006. .
 Letter published in French newspaper in Istanbul by Behbud Javanshir's wife Tamara Javanshir and reprinted in John Dos Passos's book The Orient Express in a chapter entitled "Constantinople, July 1921: Assassination" (New York and London: Harper & Brothers, 1927), pp. 14–16.
 John Dos Passos' account of the event as a witness of the commotion of the murder at Pera Palace Hotel, Istanbul on July 18, 1921. Dos Passos was staying at Pera Palace and witnessed the commotion around the crime scene at the hotel.  See John Dos Passos's book, The Orient Express, chapter 2: "Constantinople, July 1921: Assassination" (New York and London: Harper & Brothers, 1927), page 9.

1877 births
Azerbaijani people murdered abroad
1921 deaths
People from Tartar District
Azerbaijan Democratic Republic politicians
Assassinated Azerbaijani politicians
People assassinated by Operation Nemesis
Interior Ministers of Azerbaijan
Deaths by firearm in Turkey
People murdered in Turkey
Istanbul University Faculty of Medicine alumni